The 1944 NCAA basketball tournament involved eight schools playing in single-elimination play to determine the national champion of men's NCAA Division I college basketball. It began on March 24, 1944, and ended with the championship game on March 28 in New York City. A total of nine games were played, including a third place game in each region.

Utah, coached by Vadal Peterson, won the national title with a 42–40 victory in the final game over Dartmouth, coached by Earl Brown. Arnie Ferrin of Utah was named the tournament's Most Outstanding Player. Utah became the first team to play in both the NIT and NCAA tournament in the same season. Utah was given a second chance to play in the NCAA Tournament after a March 1944 automobile accident killed a coaching aide and seriously injured two players on the Arkansas team.

Utah's winning team featured Wataru Misaka, who later joined the New York Knicks to become the first person of color to play in modern professional basketball.

Locations
The following are the sites selected to host each round of the 1944 tournament:

Regionals

March 24 and 25
East Regional, Madison Square Garden, New York, New York
West Regional, Municipal Auditorium, Kansas City, Missouri

Championship Game

March 28
Madison Square Garden, New York, New York

Teams

Bracket

Regional third place

See also
 1944 National Invitation Tournament
 1944 NAIA Division I men's basketball tournament

References

NCAA Division I men's basketball tournament
Ncaa
NCAA Men's division i basketball